Pappas Telecasting Companies was a diversely organized broadcasting company headquartered in Visalia, California, United States. Founded in 1971, it was one of the largest privately held broadcasting companies in the country, with its stations reaching over 15% of all U.S. households and over 32% of Hispanic households. Apart from owning and/or operating many television stations, the company formerly had two radio stations in its possession, KTRB AM 860 and KMPH-AM 840—changed from KPMP in June 2006 to reflect its nearby sister/flagship television station, Fox affiliate KMPH-TV, both in Fresno, California.

Bankruptcy

On May 10, 2008, thirteen of Pappas' stations filed for Chapter 11 Bankruptcy protection. Pappas cited "the extremely difficult business climate for television stations across the country" in papers filed with the U.S. Bankruptcy Court in Wilmington, Delaware. The company reported in court filings that it had more than $536 million in debt and $460 million in assets. Problems that led to the bankruptcy included poor performance of The CW network, its now-former involvement with Azteca America, and preparations for the 2009 analog shutdown. Stations involved in the bankruptcy were KMPH-TV, KFRE-TV, KPTM, KXVO, WCWG, KPTH, KMEG, KTNC-TV, KAZH, KDBC-TV, KREN-TV, KAZR-CA and KCWK. It was later ordered on September 10, 2008 that the affected stations must be sold off by February 15, 2009.  Its other stations, and the corporation itself, were not part of the bankruptcy.   On May 14 of the same year, company founder Harry J. Pappas filed for Chapter 7 bankruptcy at the Delaware court, where a judge could order his personal assets sold to pay off creditors.  13 days later, on May 27, KCWK in Walla Walla, Washington (in the Yakima, Washington television market) ceased operations as a result of the bankruptcy. 

On September 17, bankruptcy trustee E. Roger Williams put KREN and its repeaters under contract to Entravision Communications for $4 million, which would double as a minimum bid for the station as it goes up for auction in late October.  New World TV Group (later renamed, Titan TV Broadcast Group; unrelated to New World Communications) agreed to acquire the remaining Pappas stations involved in the bankruptcy filing on December 17. The sale was approved by the United States bankruptcy court on January 16, 2009. The remaining stations that weren't involved in the initial bankruptcy filing were later placed in a liquidating trust in December 2011.

KMPH Radio ceased operations September 1, 2010 due to lack of revenue. Two weeks later, KTRB went into receivership with Comerica Bank, under license from KTRB Trust. This marked the end of Pappas era.

Former Pappas-owned stations 
Stations arranged alphabetically by state and by city of license. 

Notes:
 1 80% was owned by Pappas; 20% was owned by TV Azteca from 2001 until 2018.
 2 Owned by Waitt Broadcasting, Pappas operated KMEG under a local marketing agreement.
 3 Owned by Lincoln Broadcasting from 2006-2015, Pappas operated KFXL under a local marketing agreement.
 4 Owned by Hill Broadcasting, Pappas operated KTVG under a local marketing agreement.
 5 Owned by Colins Broadcasting, Pappas operated KSNB under a local marketing agreement.
 6 Owned by Mitts Telecasting Company, Pappas operated KXVO under a local marketing agreement.

Former Broadcast Network
 TuVisión

References

External links 
 Biography of Harry J. Pappas

Mass media companies established in 1971
Mass media companies disestablished in 2018
The CW
 
Defunct broadcasting companies of the United States
Defunct mass media in California
Companies that filed for Chapter 11 bankruptcy in 2008